was a town located in Arida District, Wakayama Prefecture, Japan.

As of 2003, the town had an estimated population of 4,961 and a density of 25.32 persons per km2. The total area was 195.96 km2.

On January 1, 2006, Shimizu, along with the towns of Kanaya and Kibi (all from Arida District), was merged to create the town of Aridagawa.

External links
Official town website (in Japanese)

Dissolved municipalities of Wakayama Prefecture
Aridagawa, Wakayama